Pilostenaspis lateralis is a species of long-horned beetle in the family Cerambycidae.

References

Further reading

 
 

Trachyderini
Beetles described in 1884